Nikolay Vasilyevich Kolomeitsev (born 1 September 1956) is a Russian political figure and a deputy of the 2nd, 3rd, 5th, 6th, 7th, and 8th State Dumas.
 
In the 1980s-1990s, he was an instructor in the industrial and transport and socio-economic departments of the Rostov City Committee of the Communist Party of the Soviet Union. From 1994 to 1997, he was the deputy of the Legislative Assembly of the Rostov Oblast. From 1997 to 1999, he was the deputy of the 2nd State Duma. From 1999 to 2003, he was the deputy of the 3rd State Duma. In 2007, he was re-elected for the 5th State Duma. On March 2, 2008, he was elected to the Legislative Assembly of the Rostov Oblast of the 4th convocation. From 2011 to 2016, he was the deputy of the 6th State Duma. In 2016 and 2021, he was elected deputy for the 7th and 8th State Dumas, respectively.

References
 

 

1956 births
Living people
Communist Party of the Russian Federation members
21st-century Russian politicians
Eighth convocation members of the State Duma (Russian Federation)
Seventh convocation members of the State Duma (Russian Federation)
Sixth convocation members of the State Duma (Russian Federation)
Fifth convocation members of the State Duma (Russian Federation)
Third convocation members of the State Duma (Russian Federation)
Second convocation members of the State Duma (Russian Federation)
People from Rostov Oblast